Peter Cochrane may refer to these notable people:
Peter Cochrane (British Army officer)
Peter Cochrane (historian)

See also
Peter Cochran (disambiguation)